Polyphyllia is a genus of cnidarians belonging to the family Fungiidae.

The species of this genus are found in Indian and Pacific Ocean.

Species:

Polyphyllia novaehiberniae 
Polyphyllia talpina

References

Fungiidae
Scleractinia genera